Singida Wind Power Station, also Singida Wind Farm, is a potential  wind-powered electricity power station, under construction in Tanzania.

Location 
The coordinates of the power station are 04°53'58.0"S, 34°47'22.0"E (Latitude:-4.899450; Longitude:34.789432).

Overview 
The power station is privately owned by Wind East Africa Limited. The power generated is projected at 100 megawatts and will be sold to the Tanzanian power company Tanesco for integration into the national power grid. The station construction cost is budgeted at US$285 million, and the station is expected to be ready in December 2017.

Ownership
The power station is owned by a consortium that consists of Six Telecoms, a Tanzanian company, Aldwych International Limited of the United Kingdom, and the International Finance Corporation, based in Washington, D. C. Wind East Africa Limited is the special purpose vehicle formed by the consortium to develop, own, and operate the power station.

See also 

List of power stations in Tanzania

References

External links 
 Website of Wind East Africa Limited
 Website of Tanzania Electric Supply Company (Tanesco)

Wind farms in Tanzania
Singida Region